Bakool (Maay: Bokool) is a region (gobol) in southwestern Somalia.

Overview
It is bordered by the Somali regions of Hiiraan, Bay and Gedo.

Bakool, like Gedo and Bay, as well as most parts of the Jubbada Dhexe (Middle Juba) region, used to be a part of the old Upper Region, which was subdivided in the mid-1980s. It has its capital at Xuddur.

In March 2014, Somali Armed Forces assisted by an Ethiopian battalion with AMISOM re-captured the Bakool province's capital Hudur from the Al-Shabaab militant group. The offensive was part of an intensified military operation by the allied forces to remove the insurgent group from the remaining areas in southern Somalia under its control.

Districts
The Bakool region consists of five districts:

 Tiyeegloow District
 Rabdhure District
 Waajid District
 Xuddur District
 El Barde District

Major towns
Rabdhuure
Waajid
Xuddur
Tieglow 
Yow Kooyow
El-berde
Qurajome
Buurdhuxunle
Garasweyne
Moragabey
Kulan-Jereer
Buur-Edow
Warshiire
Sedax-Buurood
Boodaan
Wardhujiiley
Kurta
Celgaras 
Misir 
Shiimo
Afgoye

References

External links
Administrative map of Bakool Region

 
Regions of Somalia